Flaming volcano is a large tropical group cocktail typically made with rum, brandy, pineapple juice, orange juice, and orgeat syrup. Many variations exist, and the cocktail in the 21st century is more about the presentation than an adherence to a set list of ingredients.  It is usually a multi-user drink, served to a group in a special vessel known as a volcano bowl, which is a decorative ceramic bowl (typically of about  capacity) designed with a rising central hub feature resembling a volcanic cone.  The cone includes a "crater" reservoir which can be partially filled with rum or another flammable liquor. The crater liquor is carefully ignited when serving, creating a mild volcanic ambiance with its central blue flame.

A flaming volcano is usually served to a group of two or more people with a set of very long straws to facilitate convenient group sipping from a comfortable distance and for safety. It is sometimes called a scorpion bowl.

History 

The communal flaming volcano drink is said to have been started in Hawaii in the 1950s or 1960s as a cross between flammable one person ice formed "volcano cockails" and larger communal bowl cocktails. Jeff Berry in Beachbum Berry Remixed has Don the Beachcomber as an early example of serving the larger flaming bowl at his location in St. Paul, Minnesota. He also lists a Lei Lani Volcano variation from the Polyneisan Village Resort (Walt Disney World) from the 1970s. It is typically served only at tiki bars. It also has strong roots in its precursor, the scorpion bowl.

Some claim that it originated from or was popular in Chile during the times of Augusto Pinochet., but credible sources, especially as to the drink's original Chilean origin, are non-existent.

Preparation and variations

One version of flaming volcano is prepared by blending the ingredients with ice. It is sometimes served with dry ice to provide for a fog effect. The base liquor is usually some form of rum, with brandy commonly added, but vodka and even gin appear in some recipes. Other versions might use lime juice, grapefruit juice, maple syrup, guava nectar, or coconut rum.

The cocktail was also rebranded as "the mystery drink" at tiki Bars such as the Kahiki and the Mai Kai.

Early versions of the ceramic bowl were made by Orchids of Hawaii and Bamboo of China.  Newer versions have been designed by artists such as Shag (pictured) and others.

In popular culture
As noted in the book The B-52's Universe by Mats Sexton, the band The B-52's formed after its members shared a flaming volcano at a Chinese Restaurant in Athens, Georgia in November of 1976. Due to a lack of funds, the band had decided to share a cocktail rather than order any food.

See also
 List of cocktails
 Tiki mugs
 Tiki culture

References

Cocktails with brandy
Cocktails with rum
Cuisine of the Western United States
Flaming drinks